Arshag Chobanian (15 July 1872 – 9 June 1954) was an Armenian short story writer, journalist, editor, poet, translator, literary critic, playwright, philologist, and novelist.

Biography 
His father was a respected goldsmith.

In 1898 he founded his famous periodical Anahit. His connections and acquaintances with prominent literary and intellectual figures in France allowed him to write about the Armenian genocide and injustices freely in popular French newspapers such as Mercure de France. He became a strong advocate of western support in order to save the Armenians from the oppression of the Ottoman government. After joining the Ramgavar party, he met with Boghos Nubar and participated in the Armenian National Delegation during the Paris Peace Conference of 1919. In 1933 he visited Soviet Armenia and met with prominent intellectuals. After returning to Paris, he died on 9 June 1954.

Literary career 

Arshag Chobanian is considered one of the fundamental Armenian realist writers, though he also has many works in the romantic style as well.

Among some of the readers of these writings was famed French novelist and writer Anatole France, who thereafter sympathized with the plight of the Armenian people. Chobanian wrote literary criticism of European writers such as  Emile Verhaeren, Honoré de Balzac, Victor Hugo, Émile Zola, Henrik Ibsen, and many more.

References 

1872 births
1954 deaths
19th-century writers from the Ottoman Empire
People from Beşiktaş
Armenians from the Ottoman Empire
French people of Armenian descent
Emigrants from the Ottoman Empire to France
19th-century Armenian writers
20th-century Armenian writers